Hong Kong English is a variety of the English language native to Hong Kong. The variant is either a learner interlanguage or emergent variant, primarily a result of Hong Kong's British overseas territory history and the influence of native Hong Kong Cantonese speakers.

Background
English is one of two official languages in Hong Kong – the other being Chinese (Cantonese) – and is used in academia, business and the courts, as well as in most government materials. Major businesses routinely issue important material in both Chinese and English, and all road and government signs are bilingual.  
 
Since the Handover, English in Hong Kong remains primarily a second language, in contrast to Singapore where English has been shifting toward being a first language. The falling English proficiency of local English language teachers has come under criticism. The proportion of the Hong Kong population who report using English (that is, all forms) as their "usual spoken language" increased from 2.8% in 2006 to 4.3% in 2016, while 51.1%, 63.5% and 65.6% respectively, reported being able to speak, write and read the language.

Status
The existence of Hong Kong English, as a distinct variety of the English language, is still a matter of debate among many scholars.

Evidence suggesting variant established
In the literature examining the existence of Hong Kong English as a distinct variety, scholars have sought evidence of expression of the variant which may be classified according to the following criteria:
 
 Standard and recognisable accent; research has demonstrated the existence of, and local preference for, a local Hong Kong English accent
 Distinctive vocabulary; local media, such as newspapers, clearly show a shared common vocabulary used among English speakers in Hong Kong
 History; a continuous link can be drawn between Hong Kong English and early pidgin forms used to communicate between traders in Canton before the establishment of Hong Kong as a colony.
 Literature using the variant; there is a growing corpus of literature produced in English which is meant for local consumption.
 Reference works; reference texts describing Hong Kong English are beginning to emerge, such as A Dictionary of Hong Kong English: Words from the Fragrant Harbor
Using these criteria, scholars have said that Hong Kong English possesses the attributes of a distinct variety.

Hong Kong English is also featured as a separate entity in the Oxford Guide to World English, under the sub-heading of "East Asia". Hong Kong English is also included as a separate variety of English within the International Corpus of English, with a dedicated local research team collecting data to describe the usage of English in Hong Kong.

Evidence suggesting variant not established
It has also been argued that there is no such thing as Hong Kong English and the predominance of recent works discuss Hong Kong phonology in terms of erroneous deviation from varieties such as British and American English. In one co-authored work describing a study conducted of five Hong Kong speakers of English, it was concluded, controversially, as they conceded, that HKE was at most an emergent variety and perhaps no more than a "learner interlanguage". In the Dynamic Model of Postcolonial Englishes, it has been classified as in the third phase, that of Nativisation, but more recently it has been shown that many young people are happy to identify themselves as speakers of Hong Kong English, so it may be regarded as progressing into the fourth phase, that of Endonormative Stabilisation. Furthermore, by the criteria identified in the above section, scholars have noted that there is very little literature produced in English which is meant for local consumption.

Intelligibility and recognition
It has been demonstrated that English spoken in Hong Kong is highly intelligible to listeners from elsewhere, which helps explain why an increasing number of people are happy to be identified as speakers of this variety. However, it has been noted that language use is highly politicised and compartmentalised in Hong Kong, where the two official languages are seen as having different and distinct uses. Indeed, it has been argued that even English language teachers in Hong Kong would refuse to acknowledge the local variant of English within a classroom setting, opting instead for more "standard" variations.

It has been argued that the lack of recognition of Hong Kong English as a variety on par with other Asian varieties, such as Indian English or Singaporean English, is due to a lack of research.

Pronunciation
As a result of the colonial legacy, the pronunciation of Hong Kong English was assumed to be originally based on British English, However, nowadays, there are new features of pronunciation derived from American English, and the influence of American English has emerged. Furthermore, there seem to be some innovative developments that are unique to Hong Kong English, such as a split in the realisation of /v/ as [f] or [w]. Some of the more salient features are listed below.

Segments
  tends to be [d], so this is [dis],
It seems that [w] occurs at the start of a stressed syllable while [f] occurs at the start of an unstressed syllable.
 There is alternation between [l] and [n], and the same speaker may alternate with words such as light and night, and both loud and number may have either [l] or [n] at the start.
 Words with final /s/ add long vowel / i:/, such as Joyce [dʒɔɪs] pronunciation becomes Joysee [dʒɔɪsi:].
 In final consonant clusters, just as with many other varieties of English, there is a tendency for simplification, so the plosive at the end of words such as think and camp is often omitted. Deletion of coronal plosives /t/ and /d/ from word-final clusters has been reported to occur in about 76% of tokens, though this frequency is a little less if the function words and and just are excluded from the analysis.
 Like many accents in Britain, Hong Kong English is non-rhotic, so  is only pronounced before a vowel.
 Vowel reduction is often avoided in function words, so a full vowel occurs in words such as and and to as well as the first syllable of content words such as accept and patrol.

Intonation
 Multi-syllable words are often differently stressed. For example, while the word "latte" is pronounced  in most variants of the English language, it is usually pronounced  in Hong Kong English, with the second syllable stressed instead of the first.
 Omission of entire "r-" syllables in longer words; "difference" becomes , and "temperature" becomes .
 Words beginning with unstressed syllables "con" are generally pronounced its stressed form  with a lower pitch, e.g. "connection", "consent", "condition". Words beginning with stressed syllable "com-" e.g. "competition", "common" and "compromise" are pronounced .
 The suffix -age is generally pronounced ; "message" is pronounced , "package" is pronounced  etc.
 There is less vowel reduction in unstressed syllables, and some variation in the placement of stress.
 Compared to other varieties of English, there is less difference between stressed and unstressed syllables. In most varieties of English, unstressed syllables are reduced, taking less time. This difference is smaller in Hong Kong English.

Others
In Cantonese, there is no structure of diphthong+consonant. As a result,  becomes ,  becomes ,  becomes ,  becomes ,  becomes ,  becomes ,  becomes ,  becomes  etc.
 Many Chinese will speak a foreign language with the same characteristic monosyllabic staccato of spoken Chinese, with varying degrees of the natural liaisons between syllables that natives employ.
 Pronouncing the silent ,  sounds in words like "Green-wich", "Bon-ham", "Chat-ham", "Beck-ham" are often reflected in the transliteration of the words, for example, Beckham is transliterated  (pronounced ).
 Merging the contrast of voiceless/voiced consonants with aspirated/unaspirated if any contrast exists in Cantonese. This is because English voiceless consonants are most often aspirated, whereas the voiced ones are always unaspirated. The stop  stays as  but  becomes ;  stays as  but  becomes ;  stays as  but  becomes ;  becomes  and  becomes  (except when preceded by s, where the English consonants are unaspirated).
 Merging voiceless/voiced consonants into voiceless if there is no contrast in aspirated/unaspirated in Cantonese.
 Confusion between homographs (words with the same spelling but different meanings), e.g. the noun "resume" (a CV) and the verb "resume" (to continue).

American/British spelling and word usage
 Both British and American spellings are in common use, although the British variant predominates in official circles, and remains the officially taught form in education.
 However, Hong Kong has significant American influence in its treatment of abbreviations and initialisms: the full point is expected in shortened titles (Mr., Ms., Dr., St.), and government honours also retain the full point in post-nominals (G.B.M., G.B.S.), whereas British English no longer uses the full point.
 When referring to the same thing, British vocabulary is more commonly used, for example: rubbish bin instead of garbage/trash can; lift instead of elevator; mobile phone instead of cell phone; estate agent instead of real estate broker.

Hong Kong vocabulary/expressions

Some words and phrases widely understood in Hong Kong are rare or unheard of elsewhere. These often derive from Chinese, Anglo-Indian, or Portuguese/Macanese.
 A  is a seal or stamp, e.g. a "Company chop" is the seal or stamp of a corporation (it actually originates from colonial Indian English.) It is now used in some other Commonwealth countries as a non-official term.
 A Tai-Pan (or 'taipan') is a term used in the early 20th century for a business executive of a large corporation.
 An amah is a term used in the early 20th century for a live-in servant (from Macanese/Portuguese- ama nurse); now supplanted by "[domestic] helper"
 A 'shroff' is a cashier, in a hospital, a government office or a car park (parking garage).
 "Godown" is a warehouse From the Malay "gudang". The ultimate origins were traced to the Indian subcontinent.
Nullah is a concrete or stone-lined canal or a reinforced creek bed used to contain run-off. Nullah entered the English language from Hindi.
 Jetso ("") is sometimes used to mean discount or special offer.
 'Add oil', direct translation of the Chinese , an exclamatory entreaty of encouragement. The usage became popularised by the Umbrella Movement.
 Lai see a transliteration of the Cantonese term, also referred to as "red envelopes", or "red packets", or by the Mandarin term , for red envelopes bearing auspicious Chinese phrases or characters containing money and handed out as gifts, particularly during the Lunar New Year festival. People often read souvenir wrongly as soften-near.

In 2015 University of Hong Kong professor Lisa Lim stated that some of the words, by that year, had declined in usage.

See also

 Chinese Pidgin English
 Phonemic differentiation
 Regional accents of English
 Chinglish
 Singlish
 Macanese Portuguese
 Code-switching in Hong Kong
 Education in Hong Kong
 Hong Kong Cantonese
 Languages of Hong Kong

References

External links
Caryn Yeo, (23 Feb 2009). "Hong Kong's English, Cantonese conundrum", The Straits Times
"The cat got your mother tongue? – The Brits make a linguistic comeback", The Economist (12 June 2008)

English
Dialects of English
City colloquials